Tampere Vocational College Tredu (Finnish: Tampereen seudun ammattiopisto Tredu) is a college based in Tampere, Finland. It is part of the Tampere Upper Secondary Education and offers study vocational programmes in Finnish secondary education. 1 January 2013 Pirkanmaa Educational Consortium and Tampere College united to become Tampere Vocational College Tredu. It offers more than 100 programmes in seven out of eight vocational education sectors which exist in the Finnish vocational education standards:

 Culture Sector
 Social Sciences, Business, and Administration Sector
 Natural Sciences Sector
 Technology, Communications, and Transport Sector
 Natural Resources and the Environment Sector
 Social Services, Health and Sports Sector
 Tourism, Catering and Domestic Services Sector

Its campus is located in Tampere, except for the forestry campus which is located in Kuru, Ylöjärvi.

See also
 Tampere
 Education in Finland

References

External links
 (in English)

Schools in Finland
Tampere Vocational College Tredu
Buildings and structures in Tampere